Park Central is a private housing estate and shopping mall in Tseung Kwan O, New Territories, Hong Kong, located near MTR Tseung Kwan O station. It consists of 12 residential blocks in two phases with a total of 4,152 units, and a  shopping mall, the largest one in Tseung Kwan O. It was jointly developed in 2002, 2003 and 2005 by the consortium of property developers, including Sun Hung Kai Properties, Henderson Land Development, Chinachem Group, MTR Corporation and Nan Fung Group.

Demographics
According to the 2016 by-census, Park Central had a population of 12,338. The median age was 38.7 and the majority of residents (92.2 per cent) were of Chinese ethnicity. The average household size was 2.9 people. The median monthly household income of all households (i.e. including both economically active and inactive households) was HK$55,000.

Politics
Park Central is located in O Tong constituency of the Sai Kung District Council. It was formerly represented by Lui Man-kwong, who was elected in the 2019 elections until July 2021.

References

External links

Official website of Park Central

Private housing estates in Hong Kong
Shopping centres in Hong Kong
Residential buildings completed in 2002
Residential buildings completed in 2003
Residential buildings completed in 2005
Tseung Kwan O
Sun Hung Kai Properties
Henderson Land Development
Nan Fung Group
Chinachem
2002 establishments in Hong Kong